Kenneth Colley (born 7 December 1937) is an English film and television actor whose career spans over 60 years. He came to wider prominence through his role as Admiral Piett in the Star Wars films The Empire Strikes Back (1980) and Return of the Jedi (1983).

Career
Colley was born in Manchester, Lancashire. One of his early appearances on British television was as Noah Riley in the 1970s police drama The Sweeney, in an episode entitled Trap. He played Jesus in The Life of Brian, having also appeared in the earlier Monty Python-related production Ripping Yarns episode "The Testing of Eric Olthwaite" alongside Michael Palin. As a Shakespearean actor he played the Duke of Vienna in the BBC Television Shakespeare production of Measure for Measure in 1979.

Colley worked extensively with British director Ken Russell from the early 1970s to the early 1990s as part of a repertory of actors who appeared across Russell's television and film work. He played the role of Modest Tchaikovsky in the film The Music Lovers (1971). He went on to play the role of LeGrand in Russell's The Devils (also 1971); he played the journalist Krenek in the biopic Mahler (1974); the composer Frédéric Chopin in Lisztomania (1975); Mr Brunt in Russell's adaptation of The Rainbow (1989) by D. H. Lawrence. His last role for Russell was as Captain Dreyfus in the film Prisoner of Honor (1991), which dealt with the Dreyfus affair.

For his work in the Star Wars franchise, Colley's role as Admiral Piett is noted for differing from the other ill-fated Imperial officers who appeared alongside him in The Empire Strikes Back (1980), as Colley was the only actor to play an Imperial officer in a second Star Wars film, reprising his role in Return of the Jedi (1983). Colley reprised his role as Piett in the Cartoon Network animated special Lego Star Wars: The Empire Strikes Out in September 2012. Coincidentally, Colley and David Prowse had a part in the fantasy film Jabberwocky (1977).

Colley also played a notable role in the 1982 Clint Eastwood film Firefox, where he played a Soviet colonel tasked with the protection of the Firefox and its secrets. He went on to play SS-Standartenführer Paul Blobel in the Second World War drama War and Remembrance.

Colley has directed one film to date, Greetings (2007), a horror film starring Kirsty Cox, Henry Dunn and Ben Shockley.

In 2017, Colley recorded a series of short narrations for inclusion on Pop Wasteland, an album by Folkestone band Phenomenal Cat.

Personal life

Colley lives in Hythe, Kent.

According to comments which Terry Gilliam (who directed him in Jabberwocky and acted with him in Life of Brian) made in the DVD audio commentaries for both films, Colley has a stammer in real life. When he had a role in a film, however, he could recite the lines perfectly. Stuttering is a character trait, however, in his role as the Accordion Man in the 1978 BBC television drama, Pennies from Heaven.

Filmography

Film

Television

References

External links
 

1937 births
Male actors from Manchester
English male film actors
English male television actors
Living people
People from Hythe, Kent